The 2021 season is Dhangadhi F.C.'s 1st Nepal Super League season.

Season overview
On 15 March, Dhangadhi FC has announced the signing of Nepal national football team midfielder Bishal Rai as a marquee  player for Nepal Super League (NSL). 

On the auction of Nepal Super League, Dhangadhi FC bought several national level players such as Dinesh Rajbanshi, Rupesh KC, Pujan Uperkoti, etc. 

On 15 April, Dhangadhi FC signed a contract with Nepal national football team Goalkeeper Kiran Chemjong and has introduced him as an iconic player. 

On 16 April, Dhangadhi FC signed contract with Afeez Oladipo.

Competitions

Nepal Super League

Results

League table

Playoffs

Bracket

Preliminary

Final

Statistics

Goalscorers 
Includes all competitive matches. The list is sorted alphabetically by surname when total goals are equal.

Awards

NSL Super Defender of the League

NSL Super Goalkeeper of the League

References

External links
Nepal Super League 2021

Nepalese football clubs 2021 season
Nepal Super League